Sergei Prokofiev wrote his Symphony No. 5 in B-flat major, Op. 100, in Soviet Russia  in the summer of 1944.

Background
Fourteen years had passed since Prokofiev wrote the first version of his Symphony No. 4 in C major.

World War II was still raging during the symphony's gestation, and Prokofiev composed it in the Soviet Union. He gave out in a statement at the time that he intended it as "a hymn to free and happy Man, to his mighty powers, his pure and noble spirit." He added "I cannot say that I deliberately chose this theme. It was born in me and clamoured for expression. The music matured within me. It filled my soul."

Movements

The piece is in four movements, lasting 40–45 minutes:
 Andante (in B-flat major)
 Allegro marcato (in D minor)
 Adagio (in F major)
 Allegro giocoso (in B-flat major)

Movement I
The first movement is in a tightly argued sonata form: its exposition presents two themes – one calm and sustained, the other soaring with tremolo accompaniment from strings – which are then involved in an elaborate and climactic development section. The movement is wrapped up with an electrifying coda, punctuated by a roaring tam-tam and low piano tremolos.
1st theme, mm. 1–7

mm. 8–10

mm. 29–30

2nd theme, mm. 54–64

mm. 74–77

Closing theme, mm. 83–86

Movement II
The second movement is an insistent scherzo in Prokofiev's typical toccata mode, framing a central theme in triple time.
mm. 3–10

mm. 56–58

mm. 112–115

mm. 120–127

mm. 154–157

Movement III
The third movement is a dreamy slow movement, full of nostalgia, which nevertheless builds up to a tortured climax, before receding back to dreaminess.
mm. 4–8

mm. 55–62

mm. 82–84

"tortured climax" mm. 125–131

Movement IV
The finale starts with a cello choir playing a slow introduction containing elements from the first theme of the first movement, which then launches into the movement proper, a rondo. The playful ("giocoso") main theme is contrasted with two calmer episodes, one played by the flute, the other a chorale on strings. At the end, just as the movement is striving to end in a victorious tone, the music unexpectedly degenerates into a manic frenzy (rehearsal mark 111), which is then interrupted by a string quartet playing staccato "wrong notes" (rehearsal mark 113) with rude interjections from low trumpets, making the ultimate orchestral unison on B-flat sound all the more ironic.
mm. 3–6

Theme from first movement, mm. 15–22

mm. 29–36

mm. 37–38

mm. 54–55

mm. 83–90

mm. 164–172

Instrumentation
The work is scored for the following:

Premiere
The symphony was premiered on January 13, 1945, in the Great Hall of Moscow Conservatory by the USSR State Symphony Orchestra, conducted by Prokofiev himself.

As he took the stage, artillery fired. He paused until it finished. This left a great impression upon the audience, who upon leaving the Great Hall learned the gunfire marked the Red Army's crossing of the Vistula into Germany. The premiere was very well-received, and the symphony has remained one of the composer's most popular works.

Then, in November of that year, Serge Koussevitzky and the Boston Symphony Orchestra introduced the score to America and recorded it in Boston's Symphony Hall on February 6 and 7, 1946, for RCA Victor, using an optical sound film process introduced by RCA in 1941; it was initially issued on 78-rpm discs and later on LP and CD. The symphony's rapid insertion into the repertoire was referenced by Dennis Dobson in his review of the 1951 Edinburgh Festival for Music Survey, where he panned the work as "noisy, uncouth" and a "falling off in maturity" from works such as Chout and the Piano Concerto No. 3 and went on to say, "that this work is well thought of and much played in both America and the Soviet Union speaks sociological and cultural volumes".

Notable recordings

References

External links
 

Symphonies by Sergei Prokofiev
1944 compositions
Compositions in B-flat major